Latanier may refer to

Grup Latanier, a musical group from Mauritius
Latanier palm, a common name for several species of palm trees